Alta Kotze (born 4 December 1971) is a South African former cricketer who played primarily as a right-arm fast-medium bowler. She appeared in 15 One Day Internationals for South Africa between 1997 and 1999. She played domestic cricket for Gauteng, Easterns and Limpopo.

Kotze also represented the South African Indoor Women's Cricket team. She is the most successful South African Indoor Captain ever with a 89% winning rate.

References

External links
 
 

1971 births
Living people
Cricketers from Johannesburg
South African women cricketers
South Africa women One Day International cricketers
Central Gauteng women cricketers
Easterns women cricketers
Limpopo women cricketers
20th-century South African women
21st-century South African women